Jazz a Confronto 21 is an album by American jazz pianist Don Pullen recorded in Rome, Italy, on March 21, 1975 and released on the Horo label as part of the "Jazz a Confronto" series.

Reception
The Allmusic review awarded the album 4½ stars.

Track listing
All compositions by Don Pullen except as indicated
 "Calypso in Roma" - 7:55
 "Sploogie Doo" (Dannie Richmond) - 11:36
 "Dee Arr" - 6:18
 "Traceys Of Daniel" - 11:48
Recorded at Titania Studios in Rome, Italy on March 21, 1975

Personnel
 Don Pullen — piano 
George Adams — tenor saxophone, flute, percussion
David Williams — bass, percussion
Dannie Richmond — drums, vocals

References

1975 albums
Don Pullen albums
Horo Records albums